Pachyseris is a genus of cnidarians belonging to the family Agariciidae.

The genus has almost cosmopolitan distribution.

Species

Species:
Pachyseris affinis 
Pachyseris compacta 
Pachyseris cristata

References

Scleractinia
Scleractinia genera